Variimorda villosa is a species of tumbling flower beetle in the subfamily Mordellinae of the family Mordellidae.

 These very small beetles are present in most of Europe. The adults can be encountered from July through August, especially feeding on flowers of Apiaceae species.

Their bodies have a sharp rear ending and a quite variable pattern of colours of lighter spots (yellowish, brownish, silvery, etc.).

External links
 Biolib
 Fauna Europaea

Mordellidae
Beetles of Europe
Beetles described in 1781